Ohsio Dam is an earthfill dam located in Gunma Prefecture in Japan. The dam is used for flood control and irrigation. The catchment area of the dam is 130.5 km2. The dam impounds about 15  ha of land when full and can store 1841 thousand cubic meters of water. The construction of the dam was completed in 1965.

References

Dams in Gunma Prefecture